Olga Danilović and Kristina Mladenovic won the doubles tennis title at the 2022 Ladies Open Lausanne after Ulrikke Eikeri and Tamara Zidanšek withdrew from the final.

Susan Bandecchi and Simona Waltert were the defending champions, but were defeated in the first round by Alicia Barnett and Olivia Nicholls.

Seeds

Draw

Draw

References

Main draw

Ladies Open Lausanne - Doubles
WTA Swiss Open